Edwin August Phillip von der Butz (November 10, 1883 – March 4, 1964) was an American actor, director, and screenwriter of the silent era. 

August was born in St. Louis, Missouri, and graduated from Christian Brothers College there. He acted in stock theater as leading man at the Imperial Theater in St. Louis. He went on to act on stage in New York. He appeared on Broadway in Mr. and Mrs. Daventry (1910).

He appeared in more than 150 films between 1909 and 1947.  He also directed 52 films between 1912 and 1919. He co-founded Eaco Films in 1914. He wrote novels under the pen name Montague Lawrence.

August died in Hollywood, California. His grave is located at Valhalla Memorial Park Cemetery in North Hollywood.

Partial filmography

 The Welcome Burglar (1909, Short)
 The House with Closed Shutters (1910, Short)
 The Stars and Stripes (1910) - John Paul Jones, captain of the Bonhomme Richard
 The Fugitive (1910, Short) - John - the Union Son
 His Daughter (1911, Short) - William Whittier
 The Smile of a Child (1911, Short)
 A Country Cupid (1911, Short) - Jack - Edith's Sweetheart
 Out from the Shadow (1911, Short) - Mr. Vane
 Her Awakening (1911, Short)
 The Stuff Heroes Are Made Of (1911, Short) - The Young Author
 The Making of a Man (1911, Short) - Young Woman's Family
 The Long Road (1911, Short)* - At Party
 Through Darkened Vales (1911, Short)
 The Voice of the Child (1911, Short) - The Husband
 The Eternal Mother (1912, Short) - John - the Husband
 The Old Bookkeeper (1912, Short) - The Old Bookkeeper's Employer
 Under Burning Skies (1912, Short) - On Street
 One Is Business, the Other Crime (1912, Short) - The Rich Husband
 The Lesser Evil (1912, Short) - The Young Woman's Sweetheart
 A Beast at Bay (1912, Short) - The Young Woman's Ideal
 The Sands of Dee (1912, Short) - The Artist
 Twixt Love and Ambition (1912, Short) - John Sterne
 The Detective's Stratagem (1913, Short) - The Bank President
 Brute Force (1914, Short)
 The Hoosier Schoolmaster (1914)
 Pitfalls (1914)
 When It Strikes Home (1915) - Richard Hartley
 Evidence (1915) - Curley Lushington
 The Yellow Passport (1916) - Adolph Rosenheimer
 The Social Highwayman (1916) - John Jaffray / Curtis Jaffray
 A Tale of Two Nations (1917)
 The Lion's Claws (1918) - Roger Hammond
 A Broadway Scandal (1918) - David Kendall
 The Mortgaged Wife (1918) - Darrell Courtney
 The City of Tears (1918) - Tony Bonchi
 The Idol of the North (1921) - Martin Bates
 The Blonde Vampire (1922) - Martin Kent
 Scandal Street (1925) - Howard Manning
 Dreary House (1928)
 Side Street (1929) - Henchman Mac (uncredited)
 Romance of the West (1930) - Chuck Anderson
 Orchids to You (1935) - Flower Shop Employee (uncredited)
 Come and Get It (1936) - Restaurant Patron (uncredited)
 Marked Woman (1937) - Juror (uncredited)
 Safety in Numbers (1938) - Customer
 The Rage of Paris (1938) - Receptionist (uncredited)
 Youth Takes a Fling (1938) - Railroad Conductor (uncredited)
 Mr. Smith Goes to Washington (1939) - Senator (uncredited)
 The Magnificent Ambersons (1942) - Citizen (uncredited)
 The Pride of the Yankees (1942) - Restaurant Patron (uncredited)
 Gentleman Jim (1942) - Olympic Club Member (uncredited)
 Over My Dead Body (1942) - Bailiff
 Mr. Lucky (1943) - Blood Bank Donor (uncredited)
 Song of the Thin Man (1947) - Casino Patron (uncredited)
 The Exile (1947) - Burger (uncredited)

As director
 The Sea Urchin (1913)
 The Blood Red Tape of Charity (1913)
 The Trap (1913)
 Evidence (1915)
 The Yellow Passport (1916)

References

External links

1883 births
1964 deaths
American male silent film actors
American male screenwriters
Male actors from St. Louis
20th-century American male actors
Film directors from Missouri
Burials at Valhalla Memorial Park Cemetery
Screenwriters from Missouri
20th-century American male writers
20th-century American screenwriters